Lisan ad-Din Ibn al-Khatib (Born 16 November 1313, Loja– died 1374, Fes; full name in ) was an Arab Andalusi polymath poet, writer, historian, philosopher, physician and politician from Emirate of Granada. Some of his poems decorate the walls of the palace of Alhambra in Granada. He is known for composing the muwashahs entitled "Jadaka al-Ghaithu" and "Lamma Bada Yatathanna."

He is highly esteemed both as an historian and as a poet. He was a contemporary and acquaintance of Ibn Khaldun.

His great historical work, al-Ihata fi akhbar Gharnata الإحاطة في أخبار غرناطة (The Complete Source on the History of Granada),  written in 1369, includes his autobiography. This work has yet to be translated into English.

Biography 
Ibn al-Khatib was born at Loja, near Granada. Shortly after his birth, his father was appointed to a high post at the court of Emir Ismail I in Granada. After his father and older brother were killed in the Battle of Río Salado in 1340, Ibn al-Khatib was hired to work as a secretary for his former teacher Ibn al-Jayyab, vizier to Emir Yusuf I. Following Ibn al-Jayyab's early death from the plague, Ibn al-Khatib became vizier and head of the emiri chancery, serving also in diplomatic roles in the courts of Andalusi and Maghrebi rulers.

For much of his life he was vizier at the court of the Sultan of Granada, Muhammed V.  He spent two periods in exile in the Marinid empire; (between 1360 and 1362, and 1371–74, he resided variously at Ceuta, Tlemcen and Fes). In 1374, he was imprisoned for 'Zandaqa (heresy). He was sentenced to death by suffocation. Earlier and modern historians have speculated that his many private and political feuds with the Emirs of Granada belonging to the Nasrid dynasty were probably the main factors in his treatment and execution. His body was burned before being buried at Bab Mahruq, a city gate in Fes.

Poetry 
His poetry was influenced by court poets from the Mashreq, or Islamic east, especially Abū Nuwās, Abū Tammām, and al-Mutanabbī. Ibn al-Khatib was a master of saj'(), or rhymed prose, especially in his maqamaat.

On the Plague
In his treatise about the plague (Muqni'at al-Sā'il 'an al-Maraḍ al-Hā'il), (ca.753/1362), Ibn al-Khatib explores the idea of transmission of disease through contagion, centuries before Louis Pasteur conducted his experiments in Europe. The original Arabic text is preserved in the Zaydani Collection at the Biblioteca del Real Monasterio de El Escorial, MS Arabic 1785. Of the estimated deaths due to the outbreak of bubonic plague, known as the Black Death, that swept through al-Andalus in the 14th century, the numbers range to as high as a third of the Muslim population worldwide.

In his treatise On the Plague, Ibn al-Khatib writes:
"The existence of contagion is established by experience [and] by trustworthy reports on transmission by garments, vessels, ear-rings; by the spread of it by persons from one house, by infection of a healthy sea-port by an arrival from an infected land [and] by the immunity of isolated individuals." 
While the plague hadith indicated that the Prophet suggested otherwise, "a proof taken from the traditions has to undergo modification when in manifest contradiction with the evidence of the perception of the senses."Arnold, Thomas W. and A. Guillaume,  Legacy of Islam, Oxford, 1931, p.340

Death

A detailed account of his demise was written down by Ibn Khaldun, a friend and admirer of his. As a loyal courtier of Muhammed V of Granada, Ibn al-Khatib was arrested in the wake of a 1359 coup by Muhammed's half-brother Ismail, and had his property confiscated. He was soon released due to interference by the Marinid sultan of Morocco and joined a host of Andalusian refugees in Morocco, where he settled in the Atlantic town of Salé. Here, he immersed himself in Sufi mysticism and writing. It was during this stay in Morocco that he first met Ibn Khaldun, as well as other important North African intellectuals, such as Ibn Marzuq.

In 1362, the former emir of Granada, Muhammed V, was able to regain the throne with help from the Moroccan sultan. This allowed Ibn al-Khatib to return to Granada and resume the office of Great Vizier (dhu al-wizaratayn, i.e. 'possessor of the two vizierates', meaning 'head of both the civil and military authority'). He soon ran afoul of severe political intrigue. He was eventually able to strengthen his own position while organizing the expulsion of a number of his North African political rivals from Granada. His political successes caused friction within Granada between supporters of the expelled North Africans and the politically savvy Ibn al-Khatib. When Ibn Khaldun had some diplomatic success at Granada's court, Ibn al-Khatib, fearing him as a rival, organized his expulsion.

His intrigues had made him an unpopular figure in some circles, causing two of his own students, Ibn Zamrak and Ibn Farkun, to join hands with his most powerful enemy in Granada, the Grand Qadi al-Nubahi, a man who had long held a grudge against Ibn al-Khatib. More importantly, emir Muhammed V had grown distrustful of Ibn al-Khatib for his overbearing control of the Granadan state and his strict loyalty to the Marinids of Morocco. Feeling the heat rise, in 1371 Ibn al-Khatib left for North Africa, where he was well received by the Marinid sultan Abu Faris Abdul Aziz I of Morocco. During his refuge, the Grand Qadi al-Nubahi issued a fatwa in which Ibn al-Khatib's work on Sufism and philosophy were branded heretical and his work ordered to be burned. The ad hominem nature of al-Nubahi's legal decision strongly suggest that he had a personal grudge against Ibn al-Khatib. Ibn al-Khatib wrote a refutation of the fatwa, in which he harshly attacked al-Nubahi. Numerous attempts by Granada to get Ibn al-Khatib either extradited or executed were fruitless, as the Moroccan sultan Abu Faris Abdul Aziz I refused to do so. Though the Moroccan sultan soon died, Ibn al-Khatib was ensured of protection from Ibn Ghazi, Morocco's main vizier.

Ibn al-Khatib's future turned bleak when a Granada-supported coup removed Ibn Ghazi from office and brought a new sultan to power, Abu'l-Abbas Ahmad al-Mustansir. Indebted to Granada, the new sultan ordered Ibn al-Khatib arrested and a trial be held in the Moroccan capital city of Fes, in which a Granadan group of emissaries, including his former student Ibn Zamrak, was actively involved. Despite intimidation and torture, Ibn al-Khatib kept protesting his innocence throughout the trial and denied the accusations of heresy. The final vote was far from unanimous and a council of Islamic scholars were unable to reach a conclusive decision. He was sent back to his prison cell and strangled later that night. On the next morning his body was buried near Fes' Bab al-Mahruq city gate. Unsatisfied, his enemies ordered his body dug up and thrown in a bonfire.

List of works

 The Appearance of a Ghost During a Trip of Winter and Summer (خطرة الطيف في رحلة الشتاء والصيف): a description of a 21-day journey from Granada to Almería with Yusuf I, Sultan of Granada, composed in rhyming couplets
 The Measurement of Choice in the Conditions of Places and Buildings  (معيار الاختيار في ذكر المعاهد والديار): a muqama in which Ibn al-Khatib describes 34 Andalusi cities, including Malaga, Granada, and Ronda, comparing them to the Moroccan cities Tangier, Meknes, Fes, and Sebta, which he visited while exiled in Morocco
 The Shaking of the Bag for Entertainment While Abroad (نفاضة الجراب في علالة الاغتراب): a collection of praise poetry, writings on history and geography, and personal narrative on his journey from the High Atlas back to Al-Andalus
The Badr View in the Nasirian State - Al-Lamhat al-Badriya fi al-Dawla al-Nasriya, ed. Arab & Latin transl. M.Casiri, Biblioteca arabico-hispana escurialensis, II, Madrid 1770.
Compendium on Granada (in 5 vols.) - Al'Ihatat fi 'Akhbar Ghurnata (Arabic)
Muqni'at al-Sā'il 'an al-Maraḍ al-Hā'il, a treatise on the Black Death and contagion, Zaydani Collection at the Biblioteca del Real Monasterio de El Escorial, MS Arabic 1785. 
The Scholars' Recitations of Dreams of the Kings of Islam
Biographies, Dates and Connections - 'Awsaf an-Naas fi al-Tawarikh wa'l-Salaat (Arabic)
A Clerk after the People Move (Politics of Granada & Morocco) - Kanasat al-Dukan baad Intaqal as-Sakan
Calibrate Selection in Institutes of Mind
Views of Sanseddin Ben Khatib in Morocco and Andalusia
Malaga and Sala
The Masterpiece of the Book and the Purity of the Elect
Manuscripts
Magic and Poetry
The Book of Rehana and the sorrow of the Creator
Garden Definition of Sharif Love
A Message in PoliticsBibliography
Jaysh Al-Tawshih of Lisan Al-Din Ibn Al-Khatib (Arabic), An Anthology of Andalusian Arabic Muwashshahat'', Alan Jones (Editor), 1997 - 
Lisan ad-Din Ibn al-Khatib, Tarikh Isbaniya Al Islamiya (history of Muslim Spain), ed. by Levi-Provençal, new edition, Cairo, 2004
Lisan ad-Din Ibn al-Khatib, Awsaf Al Nas (description of peoples), Cairo, 2002
Lisan ad-Din Ibn al-Khatib, Khaṭrat al-ṭayf : riḥlāt fī al-Maghrib wa-al-Andalus, 1347–1362, 2003
Lisan ad-Din Ibn al-Khatib, Nafadhat al-jirab (the Ashtray of the Socks)
Lisan al-Din ibn al-Khatib homme de lettres et historien, by Abdelbaqui Benjamaa, (French) thesis, Universite de la Sorbonne Nouvelle Paris III, 1992 (microform).

See also
Ibn abd al-Malik al-Murrakushi

References

External links
 
Poem by Ibn al-Khatib sung by Fairuz  (click on the oval above the poem)
Ibn al-Jatib (second part of the page is in English) 
Website Ibn Kahldun: Ibn al-Khatib, retrieved on feb. 2, 2008  
Encyclopedia of medieval Iberia, Ibn al-Khatib, retrieved on feb. 2, 2008   
Ibn al-Khatib. Polymath Virtual Library, Fundación Ignacio Larramendi

1313 births
1374 deaths
People from the Province of Granada
14th-century Arabic poets
Poets from al-Andalus
14th-century physicians
Physicians from al-Andalus
Philosophers from al-Andalus
14th-century historians from al-Andalus
Scholars of the Nasrid period
Viziers of the Emirate of Granada
Encyclopedists of the medieval Islamic world